The House at 4305 South Linden Road is a single-family home located in Flint, Michigan. It was listed on the National Register of Historic Places in 1982.

This house is a two-story frame Queen Anne-style structure, likely constructed in 1878. It has a typical Queen Anne irregular massing, but the exterior contains decidedly Gothic ornamentation. The front has a wraparound porch supported by delicately turned posts, and is decorated with brackets, pendants, and vergeboards resembling icicles. The roof gable ends on the house contain similar lacy vergeboards.

References

		
National Register of Historic Places in Genesee County, Michigan
Queen Anne architecture in Michigan
Houses completed in 1878
Buildings and structures in Flint, Michigan
Houses in Genesee County, Michigan
1878 establishments in Michigan